Ectoedemia groschkei is a moth of the family Nepticulidae. It is found in the eastern Mediterranean Region.

There are three generations per year.

The larvae feed on Vitex agnus-castus. They mine the leaves of their host plant. The mine consists of a narrow, full-depth corridor, suddenly turning into a blotch. The frass in the corridor is concentrated in a narrow central line. In the blotch the frass is found in the oldest part. Pupation generally takes place outside of the mine, but part of the autumn generation of larvae pupate in a cocoon within the mine.

External links
Fauna Europaea
bladmineerders.nl

Nepticulidae
Moths of Europe